Anasimyia transfuga is a Palearctic species of hoverfly.

Description
External images 
For terms see Morphology of Diptera
The wing length 6-8·25 mm. Dark ground colour with steeply inclined hooked markings (the inner limb is strongly oblique). Very similar to A. contracta, but transfuga has the lateral margins of tergite 2 less concave than in contracta. There are also differences in the grey dusting of the sternites (sternites 2 and 3 are completely grey dusted in the male of transfuga).

Keys and accounts 
Coe R.L. (1953) Syrphidae
Van Veen, M. (2004) Hoverflies of Northwest Europe
Van der Goot, V.S. (1981) De zweefvliegen van Noordwest - Europa en Europees Rusland, in het bijzonder van de Benelux
Bei-Bienko, G.Y. & Steyskal, G.C. (1988) Keys to USSR insects. Diptera

Habits
A wetland species found on tall emergent pond side vegetation, margins of mesotrophic pools and lakes with Scirpus or Sparganium. Flowers visited include Caltha palustris, Ranunculus repens, white umbellifers, Sonchus arvensis, Sorbus aucuparia and Taraxacum. Flies  early May to July. The larva is aquatic and microphagous in rotting plant debris. Flies April to October.

Distribution
A Palearctic species with a wide distribution in Europe East to Siberia.

References

External links
 Biolib

Muscomorph flies of Europe
Eristalinae
Flies described in 1758
Taxa named by Carl Linnaeus